Masahiro Sampei (born 2 May 1990) is a Japanese BMX cyclist. He won the silver medal in the BMX Race of the 2014 Asian Games that was held at the Ganghwa Asiad BMX Track.

References 

BMX riders
1990 births
Living people
Asian Games medalists in cycling
Cyclists at the 2010 Asian Games
Cyclists at the 2014 Asian Games
Medalists at the 2010 Asian Games
Medalists at the 2014 Asian Games
Asian Games silver medalists for Japan
Asian Games bronze medalists for Japan